Artem Mykhaylovych Shabanov (born 7 March 1992) is a Ukrainian professional footballer who plays as a centre-back for Fehérvár.

Career
Shabanov is a product of FC Dynamo and FC Arsenal Sportive Schools in Kyiv.

Made his debut for FC Arsenal played full game against FC Sevastopol on 30 September 2013 in Ukrainian Premier League.

Career statistics

Club

International

Honours
Dynamo Kyiv
Ukrainian Super Cup: 2018
Ukrainian Cup: 2019–20

Legia Warsaw
Ekstraklasa: 2020–21

References

External links
 
 

1992 births
Living people
Footballers from Kyiv
Ukrainian people of Albanian descent
Ukrainian people of Macedonian descent
Ukrainian footballers
Ukrainian expatriate footballers
Ukraine youth international footballers
Ukraine international footballers
FC Arsenal Kyiv players
FC Volyn Lutsk players
Ukrainian Premier League players
Ekstraklasa players
Association football defenders
FC Stal Kamianske players
FC Olimpik Donetsk players
FC Dynamo Kyiv players
Legia Warsaw players
Fehérvár FC players
Expatriate footballers in Poland
Ukrainian expatriate sportspeople in Poland
Expatriate footballers in Hungary
Ukrainian expatriate sportspeople in Hungary